Todor Kobakov (born September 19, 1978) is a Bulgarian-Canadian composer, producer, arranger and pianist based in Toronto, Ontario. He is best known for his solo piano album Pop Music, his commercial and film scores and for his collaborations within Toronto's indie music scene.

Early life 
Kobakov was born in Sofia, Bulgaria, where he was raised by his mother and grandmother. He comes from a family of classical musicians all of whom are bass players.  Kobakov's grandmother played in the Bulgarian opera  and his mother worked at Bulgarian National Television as a producer of music programming.  Kobakov's musical training began at the piano as a toddler.  At age seven, he was accepted into the Lubomir Pipkov Music School in Sofia where he studied for ten years. Kobakov moved to Canada at age sixteen and graduated from the University of Toronto Music Faculty Program with a Performance Piano Degree at age twenty.

Commercials 
While in university Kobakov interned at Krystal Music & Sound Design, a commercial music house based in Toronto. The owner, David Krystal, schooled Kobakov on composing music for picture, including the use of production equipment for sound design and mixing. Kobakov landed his first commercial, a Nikon spot, in 2000. He went on to a successful run as a freelance composer landing over a dozen Canadian commercials. In 2007, Kobakov landed his first major international campaign for Vodafone Europe. Other international campaigns followed most notably for Macy's (U.S.), Foot Locker (UK) and Robinsons (UK). In 2010, Todor scored Canadian Cancer Society's short film "Fight", which won  the Silver Lion at the Cannes Lions International Advertising Festival.

Indie Collaborations  
In 2003, Kobakov wrote the string arrangements for indie pop band Stars critically acclaimed sophomore album Set Yourself On Fire. Kobakov gained considerable attention when Pitchfork Media gave the album an 8.4 rating stating that "it might be the best orchestral pop album of the past year". Kobakov went on to score string arrangements for other prominent Canadian indie artists including Metric, Emily Haines, k-os, Sarah Slean, Lindy, Small Sins and Dan Mangan. Kobakov has toured as a keyboardist with Emily Haines and The Soft Skeleton, Luke Doucet and Small Sins. In 2007, Kobakov and Lindy Vopnfjörð formed the indie rock band Major Maker. Their song "Rollercoaster" was licensed to a television commercial, which propelled the song to a Top 40 radio hit in Canada and a Canadian distribution deal with EMI Music Canada. That same year Kobakov was named "Toronto's Best Keyboardist" by Now Magazine.

In July 2010, Metric enlisted Kobakov to compose a string version of their breakthrough album Fantasies to be performed at Vivid Live, a music festival held in Sydney, Australia curated by Lou Reed and Lori Anderson. Kobakov accompanied Haines to the festival where she performed the songs accompanied by a string quartet.  Kobakov also played piano as Haines and Lou Reed performed Reed's song "Perfect Day". Metric also commissioned Kobakov to compose a string version of "Eclipse (All Yours)", the theme song from the movie The Twilight Saga: Eclipse which Metric co-wrote with Howard Shore.  Kobakov's arrangements can also be heard on Metric's iTunes Live Session album released on January 4, 2011.  Canadian hip-hop artist k-os commissioned Kobakov to compose string arrangements for his MTV Unplugged performance on March 31, 2011.

Film Scores 
Kobakov has composed eight film scores to date. His third film score of 2011 was for Fury, a neo-noir thriller starring Samuel L. Jackson, directed by David Weaver and released in 2012. Kobakov's film scores often combine piano, modern orchestration and electronic sounds. Kobakov's first film score was for the 2007 hipster comedy Young People Fucking  which received significant media attention  at the 2007 Toronto International Film Festival and further publicity when it was singled out  by Stephen Harper while the Canadian Prime Minister was campaigning for his controversial Bill C-10 proposal. Kobakov has since gravitated to darker, grittier films such as Fury, Cold Blooded, Monster Brawl, Pinkville, Sympathy, and Hit List, 2011.

In addition to his commercial and film work, Kobakov has scored television documentaries including Mega Heist which aired on The Discovery Channel and High Impact which aired on History Channel. In 2021, he scored the documentary film A.rtificial I.mmortality, for which he won the Canadian Screen Music Award for best original score for a documentary feature film.

Solo releases 
Kobakov's solo piano debut, Pop Music, was released in 2009 by 88 Calibre/Cuto.  The Canadian release was distributed by EMI Music Canada while outside of Canada the album was released digitally via iTunes. The album features eleven songs, nine of which are instrumental and two which feature guest vocals by Emily Haines of Metric and Tunde Adebimpe of TV on the Radio. The songs on Pop Music were inspired by Kobakov's life experiences in both Bulgaria and Canada. The album received strong critical acclaim across Canada. Montreal's Hour Community proclaimed  that "parts of Pop Music are so simultaneously vital and gentle we may need to invent a new word" while The Globe and Mail called Kobakov "a piano stylist in the gorgeous whimsical form of Erik Satie." The official music video for "Toronto Stories" was directed by Jaron Albertin.

Kobakov has also released two electronic albums under the moniker Cy Scobie. The releases are characterized by a mix of electronic beats and dark undertones.  Kobakov has also produced dance remixes for Emily Haines (Mostly Waving Todor K remix) and Major Maker (Rollercoaster Sofia Scandalli remix).

Filmography

Commercialography (2008 - Present)

String Arrangements

References

External links
 

1978 births
Living people
Musicians from Sofia
Musicians from Toronto
Canadian film score composers
Male film score composers
Canadian indie pop musicians
Contemporary classical music performers
Canadian indie rock musicians
Bulgarian emigrants to Canada
Best Original Score Genie and Canadian Screen Award winners
Canadian Film Centre alumni